A child prodigy is defined in psychology research literature as a person under the age of ten who produces meaningful output in some domain at the level of an adult expert. The term is also applied more broadly to young people who are extraordinarily talented in some field.

The term wunderkind (from German Wunderkind; literally "wonder child") is sometimes used as a synonym for child prodigy, particularly in media accounts. Wunderkind also is used to recognize those who achieve success and acclaim early in their adult careers.

Examples

Memory capacity of prodigies
PET scans performed on several mathematics prodigies have suggested that they think in terms of long-term working memory (LTWM). This memory, specific to a field of expertise, is capable of holding relevant information for extended periods, usually hours. For example, experienced waiters have been found to hold the orders of up to twenty customers in their heads while they serve them, but perform only as well as an average person in number-sequence recognition. The PET scans also answer questions about which specific areas of the brain associate themselves with manipulating numbers.

One subject never excelled as a child in mathematics, but he taught himself algorithms and tricks for calculatory speed, becoming capable of extremely complex mental math. His brain, compared to six other controls, was studied using the PET scan, revealing separate areas of his brain that he manipulated to solve the complex problems. Some of the areas that he and presumably prodigies use are brain sectors dealing in visual and spatial memory, as well as visual mental imagery. Other areas of the brain showed use by the subject, including a sector of the brain generally related to childlike "finger counting", probably used in his mind to relate numbers to the visual cortex.

Working memory/cerebellum theory

Noting that the cerebellum acts to streamline the speed and efficiency of all thought processes, Vandervert explained the abilities of prodigies in terms of the collaboration of working memory and the cognitive functions of the cerebellum. Citing extensive imaging evidence, Vandervert first proposed this approach in two publications which appeared in 2003. In addition to imaging evidence, Vandervert's approach is supported by the substantial award-winning studies of the cerebellum by Masao Ito.

Vandervert provided extensive argument that, in the prodigy, the transition from visual-spatial working memory to other forms of thought (language, art, mathematics) is accelerated by the unique emotional disposition of the prodigy and the cognitive functions of the cerebellum. According to Vandervert, in the emotion-driven prodigy (commonly observed as a "rage to master") the cerebellum accelerates the streamlining of the efficiencies of working memory in its manipulation and decomposition/re-composition of visual-spatial content into language acquisition and into linguistic, mathematical, and artistic precocity.

Essentially, Vandervert has argued that when a child is confronted with a challenging new situation, visual-spatial working memory and speech-related and other notational system-related working memory are decomposed and re-composed (fractionated) by the cerebellum and then blended in the cerebral cortex in an attempt to deal with the new situation. In child prodigies, Vandervert believes this blending process is accelerated due to their unique emotional sensitivities which result in high levels of repetitious focus on, in most cases, particular rule-governed knowledge domains. He has also argued that child prodigies first began to appear about 10,000 years ago when rule-governed knowledge had accumulated to a significant point, perhaps at the agricultural-religious settlements of Göbekli Tepe or Cyprus.

Development

Some researchers believe that prodigious talent tends to arise as a result of the innate talent of the child, and the energetic and emotional investment that the child ventures. Others believe that the environment plays the dominant role, many times in obvious ways. For example, László Polgár set out to raise his children to be chess players, and all three of his daughters went on to become world-class players (two of whom are grandmasters), emphasizing the potency a child's environment can have in determining the pursuits toward which a child's energy will be directed, and showing that an incredible amount of skill can be developed through suitable training.

But on the other hand George Frideric Handel was an example of the natural talent ... "he had discovered such a strong propensity to music, that his father who always intended him for the study of the Civil Law, had reason to be alarmed. He strictly forbade him to meddle with any musical instrument but Handel found means to get a little clavichord privately convey'd to a room at the top of the house. To this room he constantly stole when the family was asleep". Despite his father's opposition, Handel became a skillful performer on the harpsichord and pipe organ.

Prodigiousness in childhood is not always maintained into adulthood. Some researchers have found that gifted children fall behind due to lack of effort. Jim Taylor, professor at the University of San Francisco, theorizes that this is because gifted children experience success at an early age with little to no effort and may not develop a sense of ownership of success. Therefore, these children might not develop a connection between effort and outcome. Some children might also believe that they can succeed without effort in the future as well. Dr. Anders Ericcson, professor at Florida State University, researches expert performance in sports, music, mathematics, and other activities. His findings demonstrate that prodigiousness in childhood is not a strong indicator of later success. Rather, the number of hours devoted to the activity was a better indicator.

Rosemary Callard-Szulgit and other educators have written extensively about the problem of perfectionism in bright children, calling it their "number one social-emotional trait". Gifted children often associate even slight imperfection with failure, so that they become fearful of effort, even in their personal lives, and in extreme cases end up virtually immobilized.

See also

Chess prodigy
Genius
Gifted education
Intellectual giftedness
Late bloomer
List of child music prodigies
List of child prodigies
List of fictional child prodigies
Malleability of intelligence
Polymath
Savant syndrome

References

Further reading

External links
, "CBS News Online", 26 February 2010.

Childhood
Intelligence